The Women's 1,500m T12-13 had its Final was held on September 14 at 10:15.
The 6 first places where in exactly the same other as the 800 metres event.

Medalists

Results

References
Final

Athletics at the 2008 Summer Paralympics
2008 in women's athletics